Liao Cheng-hao (30 March 1946 – 31 January 2022) was a Taiwanese politician. 

Liao attended the National Taiwan University College of Law and served as deputy director-general of the Government Information Office and Executive Yuan before leading the Ministry of Justice's Investigation Bureau, starting in 1995. Lao was the first MJIB leader without experience in intelligence. Liao was elevated to justice minister in 1996 and served until 1998. In his two-year tenure, Liao was well-regarded for confronting organized crime. His opposition to organized crime included refusal to attend the Legislative Yuan's judicial committee meetings while Lo Fu-chu, a lawmaker allegedly associated with gangs, was a committee member. As justice minister, Liao issued an ultimatum for gangs in Taiwan to disband. While Liao led the justice ministry, he pursued former Chiayi County Council speaker  on a number of charges. Hsiao began avoiding authorities in 1996, and only agreed to face the police in September 1999, more than a year after Liao had stepped down from the justice ministry. Liao's exit from the Ministry of Justice was later attributed to his interference with the Investigation Bureau. Reflecting on the influence of criminals in Taiwanese politics in 2010, Liao stated that the group gained prominence in the late 1980s, in the waning years of the martial law period, and peaked in the 1990s, when a third of county and municipal councilors had criminal backgrounds. 

In September 1999, Liao claimed that Vincent Siew had pressured him to wiretap phones illegally and advocated for the ministry to perform other illegal acts. When Lien Chan and Siew formed the Kuomintang ticket for the 2000 presidential election, Liao refused to support the party. Instead, Liao backed independent candidate James Soong. He formally withdrew and became a political independent, but by 2001, both the People First Party and Kuomintang expressed support for Liao to run for Taipei County Magistrate. The Pan-Blue Coalition later chose Wang Chien-shien as a fusion candidate, and he lost to Su Tseng-chang. In April 2005, Liao regained his Kuomintang membership to run in the party primary for Taipei magistrate. The party nominated Chou Hsi-wei, who won the magistracy. 

After withdrawing from politics, Liao established the Tosun Public Interest Foundation to help youth and former prisoners, and advocated for improvement in Cross-Strait relations, focusing on legal and religious aspects.

See also
 Law of the Republic of China

References

1946 births
2022 deaths
National Taiwan University alumni
Politicians of the Republic of China on Taiwan from Chiayi County
Taiwanese Buddhists
Taiwanese Ministers of Justice
20th-century Taiwanese politicians
Taiwanese founders